Sand + Silence is the sixth album by the American band The Rosebuds, released in 2014 on Western Vinyl.

Track listing

References

2014 albums
The Rosebuds albums